The discography of Canadian country music artist George Canyon consists of 11 studio albums, one compilation album, 33 singles, and 24 music videos. 29 of his singles have appeared on the RPM, Radio & Records, and Billboard country charts in Canada, including 16 top tens.

Studio albums

1990s and 2000s

2010s

Compilation albums

Singles

1990s and 2000s

2010s

As a featured artist

Music videos

References

Discographies of Canadian artists
Country music discographies